Scopula afghana is a moth of the family Geometridae. It is endemic to Afghanistan.

References

Moths described in 1965
afghana
Endemic fauna of Afghanistan
Moths of Asia